Information retrieval
Content creation

Information Age